Joma is a Spanish sports clothing manufacturer that currently produces footwear and clothing for football, futsal, handball, basketball, volleyball, running, tennis, and padel. Its headquarters are located in Portillo de Toledo, Spain.

History 
Joma was founded in 1965 by Fructoso López to produce shoes for general use. The brand name comes from the given name of Fructuoso's first born son (José Manuel). In 1968, the company began to specialize in sport shoes production and distribution. After a relative success, Joma entered into football market, obtaining a great success domestically and internationally. Eventually, Joma Sport opened offices in the United States, Europe and Asia, currently present in over 70 countries throughout the world.

Sponsorships

Olympic Committees
 Bulgaria
 Jordan
 Malta
 Mexico
 Morocco
 Moldova
 Portugal
 Spain

Athletics

National teams 
 Albania
 Serbia
 Slovenia

Cricket

Football

National teams

Americas 

 Turks and Caicos

Asia

Europe

Associations
Joma is the Official ball supplier for the following leagues and associations:
  Superleague Greece
  Liga II
  Süper Lig (Official Referee Kits Only) 
  Liga 1 (Official Referee Kits Only)
  Liga 2 (Official Referee Kits Only)

Club teams

Africa 

 ASO Chlef
 MC Alger
 USM Khenchela
 Sony Sugar
 Pamplemousses SC
 CS Hammam-Lif
 Olympique Béja
 Stade Gabèsien
 Stade Tunisien
 Free State Stars
 Dodoma Jiji
 Kansanshi

Americas 
 
 Deportivo Morón (from January 2024)
 Fénix 
 S.V. Caiquetío Paradera
 Esporte Clube São Bento
 Deportes Temuco
 O'Higgins
 Cartaginés
 Deportivo Cuenca
 Antigua (from 2021)
 Marathón
 Motagua
 Platense
 Real España
 Diriangén
 UNAN Managua
 Cruz Azul
 Sporting San Miguelito
 Juan Aurich
 Dallas Sidekicks
 Fort Lauderdale Strikers
 Sumner Academy of Arts & Science
 Georgia Revolution

Asia 

 Al-Sinaat Al-Kahrabaiya 
 Naft Al-Wasat SC 
 Al-Talaba SC 
 Al-Wehdat SC
 Shabab Al-Ordon Club
 Alay Osh
 Alga Bishkek
 Ilbirs Bishkek
 Kaganat
 Neftchi
 Al-Nasr
 Nejmeh SC
 Safa
 Deren
 Selangor
 Selangor II
 Sarawak United
 Sarawak FA
 Bahla
 Al-Seeb
 Hajer
 Ohod
 Nebitçi FT
 Şagadam FK
 CSKA Pamir Dushanbe
 Istiklol
 Khatlon
 FK Andijan
 FK Buxoro
 Lokomotiv Tashkent
 Neftchi Farg'ona
 Olmaliq FK
 FK Dinamo Samarqand
 Qizilqum Zarafshon
 Mash’al Mubarek
 Metallurg Bekabad
 Sogdiana Jizzakh

Europe 

 Kukësi
 Inter Club d'Escaldes
 FS La Massana
 FC Santa Coloma
 Rànger's
 FC Pyunik
 Gabala
 Kapaz
 Keşla
 Shamakhi
 Simurq
 Zira
 Dinamo Brest
 Isloch
 FC Minsk
 FC Eindhoven
 R.S.C. Anderlecht 
 Roeselare
 Royal Antwerp
 Royale Union Saint-Gilloise
 Lierse S.K.
 Radnik Bijeljina
 Slavija Sarajevo
 Velež Mostar
 Dunav Ruse
 Levski Sofia
 Lokomotiv Sofia
 Montana
 Spartak Pleven
 Yantra Gabrovo
 FC Aluston-YUBK Alushta
 FC TSK Simferopol
 Inter Zaprešić
 Rijeka
 Akritas Chlorakas
 ASIL Lysi
 Omonia Aradippou
 FK Pardubice
 SIAD Most
 Kolín
 Ballerup-Skovlunde Fodbold
 Næstved BK
 AFC Rushden & Diamonds
 Bath City
 Chippenham Town
 Corby Town
  Dalton United
 Dorchester Town
 Exeter City
 Gloucester City
 Harlow Town
 Havant & Waterlooville
 Histon
 Horndean
 Kidderminster Harriers
 King's Lynn Town
 Morecambe
 Norwich City
 Nuneaton Town
 Sheffield F.C.
 Sutton United
 Sawbridgeworth Town
 Tividale
 Tonbridge Angels
 FC Maardu
 FC Kuressaare
 Tvøroyrar Bóltfelag
 JS Hercules
 Le Havre
 FC Metalurgi Rustavi 
 TSG 1899 Hoffenheim
 TSG 1899 Hoffenheim II
 Rot-Weiß Oberhausen
 SC Verl
 Wuppertaler SV
 Manchester 62
 Xanthi F.C.
 Finn Harps
 Abano
 Altovicentino
 Atalanta
 Atletico San Paolo Padova
 AS Bisceglie Calcio 1913 
 C.F.F.S. Cogoleto Calcio 
 Darfo Boario
 Fanfulla
 Atletico Fiumicino
 Forte dei Marmi-Querceta
 Francavilla
 Gela
 ACFD Graphi Studio Pordenone
 Isernia
 Legnano
 Marano
 Martina Franca
 Monopoli
 Nuova Quarto
 Ostia Mare
 Pedrengo
 Pergolettese
 Taranto
 Tiferno
 Torino
 Trapani
 Tuttocuoio
 Gjilani
 Džiugas
 Katastrofa
 Pakruojis
 Stumbras
 Sūduva
 Šilas
 Olaine
 Dečić Tuzi
 Iskra Danilovgrad
 Podgorica
 Sutjeska Nikšić
 FC Milsami Orhei
 Balzan F.C.
 Floriana F.C.
 Gzira United
 Hibernians F.C.
 Albion Star
 Ards
 Rabotnički
 Tikvesh
 FK Voska Sport
 Hutnik Nowa Huta
 Radomiak Radom
 Spartakus Aureus Daleszyce
 Victoria Jaworzno
 Paços de Ferreira
 Macinhatense
 Academica Clinceni
 Astra Giurgiu
 Chindia Târgoviște
 Concordia Chiajna
 Dunărea Călărași
 Gaz Metan Mediaș
 Hermannstadt
 Petrolul Ploiești
 Politehnica Iași
 CSA Steaua București (football)
 Viitorul Pandurii Târgu Jiu
 Unirea Dej
 CSKA Moscow
 Sibir Novosibirsk
 Ufa 
 Zenit Saint Petersburg
 Juvenes/Dogana
 Murata
 Tre Penne
 Albion Rovers
 Dumbarton
 Dumfermline Athletic
 East Fife
 East Kilbride Thistle
 Elgin City
 Hibernian
 Kelty Hearts
 Livingston
 Raith Rovers
 Ross County
 St Mirren
 Stranraer
 Voždovac 
 OFK Beograd
 FK Bačka Bačka Palanka 
 Hajduk Kula
 Radnički 1923
 FK BSK Batajnica
 ZTS Dubnica
 Atlético Baleares
 Fuenlabrada
 Getafe
 Guadalajara
 Leganés
 Lleida
 Real Avilés
 CD Roda
 Talavera de la Reina
 Villarreal
 Villarreal B
 Le Mont
 Ekerö IK
 Adanaspor
 Ankaragücü
 İstanbul Başakşehir 
 Inhulets Petrove
 Kremin Kremenchuk
 Kryvbas Kryvyi Rih
 Metalist Kharkiv
 Prykarpattia Ivano-Frankivsk
 Volyn Lutsk
 Karpaty Lviv
 Chaika Petropavlivska Borshchahivka
 Chernihiv
 Krystal Kherson
 Nikopol
 Poltava
 Real Pharma Odesa
 Yarud Mariupol
 Zirka Kropyvnytskyi
 Ahron Velyki Hayi
 Urahan Cherniiv
 Dovbush Chernivtsi
 Nyva Terebovlya
 Atlet Kyiv
 OFKIP Kyiv
 Khliborob Nyzhni Torhayi
 Olimp Kamianske
 OSDYuShOR-FC Zaporizhzhia
 Bala Town
 Barry
 Hakin United
 Holywell Town

Players 

 Ali Asghar Hassanzadeh
 Victor Pineda (soccer)
 Gilberto Martínez
 Paulo Wanchope
  Martin Knakal
  Petr Knakal
  Marek Smola
 Jan Zakopal
 Martin Vaniak
  Zbyněk Hauzr
  Tomáš Hunal
 Karel Rada
  Petr Pavlík
  Tomáš Janíček
  Roman Dobeš
  Tomáš Dujka
 Luis Amaranto Perea
 Johnnier Montaño
  Alex Butcher
 Michael Johnson
  Ross Skidmore
 Paddy O'Brien
  Darley Fernando Grana "Nando"
 Noureddine Naybet
 Kikin Fonseca
 Luis Ernesto Michel
 Frédéric Kanouté
 Carlos Lobatón
 Iñigo Idiakez
 Iván Helguera
 Paco Pavón
 Toni Doblas
 Antonio Lopez
 Portillo
 Nano
 Gabri
 Pablo Ibáñez
 Jesuli
 Antoñito
 Luis Helguera
 Antonio López
 Javi Venta
 Luis García
 Diego Rivas
 Dani
 Pablo Redondo
 Emilio José Viqueira
 Rachmat Afandi
 Florin Niță

Former teams 

 Standard Liège
 Unión Española
 Costa Rica national team
 Viktoria Plzeň
 Farum Boldklub
 Firpo
 Charlton Athletic
 Derby County
 Leicester City
 Romsey Town
 Stockport County 
 Watford
 Weston-super-Mare
 Cardiff City
 Bayer Uerdingen
 Mitra Kukar
 Sriwijaya
 Alessandria
 Chievo
 Fano
 Fiorentina
 Mantova
 Pavia
 Unirea Urziceni
 Albacete Balompié
 Deportivo La Coruña
 Racing de Santander
 Rayo Vallecano
 Real Oviedo
 Sevilla
 Sporting de Gijón
 Valencia
 PBAPP FC
 Perak FA
 Dorados de Sinaloa
 Alacranes de Durango
  Tampico Madero
 Celaya
 Puebla
 Neza
 Veracruz
 Indios de Ciudad Juárez
 Deportivo Guamúchil F.C.
 Jaguares de Chiapas F.C.
 Ceará
 Paraná
 Spordibaas
 Daejeon Citizen FC
 Daegu FC
 Gangwon FC
 Gwangju FC
 Jeonnam Dragons
 Kauno Žalgiris
 Jonava
 Athletic 220
 Ahrobiznes Volochysk
 Kolos Kovalivka
 Stal Kamianske
 Zirka Kropyvnytskyi

Basketball 

  Charleroi
  Esporte Clube Pinheiros
  Randers Cimbria
  Hørsholm 79ers
  Dresden Titans
  Karlsruhe Lions
  MLP Academics Heidelberg
  Ulm
  Maccabi Haifa B.C.
  Avellino
  Biella
  Piacenza
  Moncalieri
  Daegu KOGAS Pegasus
  Goyang Orion Orions
  Ulsan Hyundai Mobis Phoebus
  FAR de Rabat (basketball)
  SPM Shoeters Den Bosch
  BC UNICS
  Lokomotiv Kuban
  Breogán
  Estudiantes
  Union Neuchâtel Basket

Futsal

National teams  
 Spain

Club teams 
 FK Chrudim
 FC Ferrand Nouméa
 Primero Club de Futsal Mülheim an der Ruhr
 Eboli
 Meta Catania
 University Knights
 Valletta

Handball

National teams 
 Belarus
 Croatia
 Poland
 Slovenia
 Spain

Club teams

Europe 
 Orlen Wisła Płock
 Dijon Métropole Handball
 US Ivry Handball
 Handball Club Pressano
 CB Ciudad de Logroño
 TBV Lemgo
 RK Eurofarm Pelister

Africa 
 Club Africain

Paddle Tennis

National teams 
   Italy

Players 
  Gonzalo “Godo” Díaz
  Martin Di Nenno
  Juan Jose Mieres
  Patricia “Patty” Llaguno
  Guillermo Lahoz
  Uri Botello
  Teresa Navarro
  Javier Rico
  Ignacio Gadea
  Rafa Méndez

Rugby

National teams

Squash 
  Viktor Byrtus

Tennis 
 Matthew Barton
 Santiago Giraldo
 Klára Zakopalová
 Beatriz Haddad Maia
 Daniel Gimeno-Traver
 Pablo Carreño Busta
 Feliciano López
 Juan Carlos Ferrero
 Albert Ramos Viñolas
 Marcel Granollers
 Kimmer Coppejans
 Marie Bouzkova
 Sara Sorribes Tormo
 Tamara Zidanšek
 Aleksandar Vukic
 João Sousa

Track and field 
  Italy Athletics Federation
  Mauritius Athletics Federation
  Spain Athletics Federation

Roller hockey

Club Teams
  Lodi  (Since the 2013–14 season)

Volleyball

National teams

Club teams
 KPS Skra Bełchatów SA
 Čez Karlovarsko
 GFCA
 Il Bisonte Firenze
 Pomì Casalmaggiore
 Imoco Volley
 Latina
 Volley Lube
 Marsala Volley
 Pallavolo Macerata
 Padova
 USC Münster
 CSM Volei Alba Blaj
 Jiangsu
 AS FAR
 Tanger
 Fenerbahçe
 Al-Ramms

Sitting volleyball

National teams

References

External links 

 
 Opinion: Breve historia y datos sobre Joma 

1965 establishments in Spain
Companies based in Castilla–La Mancha
Sportswear brands
Sporting goods brands
Sporting goods manufacturers of Spain
Spanish brands
Shoe brands